The SJPF Player of the Month (often called Portuguese League Player of the Month) is an association football award that recognizes the best Portuguese League player each month of the season and is conceived by the SJPF (syndicate of professional football players). The award has been presented since the 2003–04 season and the recipient is based on individual scores assigned by the three national sports dailies, A Bola, Record, and O Jogo. The first winner of the award was Beira-Mar midfielder Juninho Petrolina in September 2003. Hulk has won the award six times. Pedro Barbosa became the first Portuguese to win the award in November 2003. The "Big Three" (Benfica, Porto and Sporting CP) have had the most winners.

Prior to the 2012–13 Primeira Liga season, the SJPF announced that the SJPF Primeira Liga Player of the Month award would be awarded to a player on a bimonthly status with one player receiving an award for two months of football that have been played. The awards would be awarded during the following periods:
 August and September (Awarded to the Player of the Month in relation to football being played between Gameweek 1 to Gameweek 6) 
 October and November (Awarded to the Player of the Month in relation to football being played between Gameweek 7 to Gameweek 11)
 December (Awarded to the Player of the Month in relation to football being played between Gameweek 12 to Gameweek 14)
 January (Awarded to the Player of the Month in relation to football being played between Gameweek 15 to Gameweek 18)
 February (Awarded to the Player of the Month in relation to football being played between Gameweek 19 to Gameweek 222)
 March (Awarded to the Player of the Month in relation to football being played between Gameweek 23 to Gameweek 36)
 April (Awarded to the Player of the Month in relation to football being played between Gameweek 27 to Gameweek 30)

Winners

Key

Statistics

Awards won by club

Awards won by nationality

Multiple winners

Awards won by position

SJPF Primeira Liga Team of the Year 
2016 team

Goalkeeper:  Ederson (Benfica)

Defenders:  Nélson Semedo (Benfica),  Victor Lindelöf (Benfica),  Sebastián Coates (Sporting CP),  Alex Telles (Porto)

Midfielders:  Danilo Pereira (Porto),  Adrien Silva (Sporting CP),  Pizzi (Benfica)

Forwards:  Gelson Martins (Sporting CP),  Jonas (Benfica),  Kostas Mitroglou (Benfica)

2017 team

Goalkeeper:  Rui Patrício (Sporting CP)

Defenders:  Nélson Semedo (Benfica),  Felipe (Porto),  Sebastián Coates (Sporting CP),  Alex Telles (Porto)

Midfielders:  Danilo Pereira (Porto),  William Carvalho (Sporting CP),  Pizzi (Benfica)

Forwards:  Gelson Martins (Sporting CP),  Jonas (Benfica),  Yacine Brahimi (Porto)

Footnotes

References

External links
 The official website of SJPF

Primeira Liga trophies and awards
Portuguese football trophies and awards
Association football player non-biographical articles